Juan de Borja may refer to:
 Juan de Borja Lanzol de Romaní, el mayor (1446–1503), held various positions in the Catholic Church, including archbishop of Monreale 
 Juan de Borja Lanzol de Romaní, el menor (1470–1500), held various positions in the Catholic Church, including Papal Legate under his grand-uncle,  Pope Alexander VI  
 Juan Castellar y de Borja (1441–1505), held various positions in the Catholic Church, including Archbishop of Trani
 Juan Buenaventura de Borja y Armendia (1564–1628), held various positions in the New Kingdom of Granada, present day Colombia
 Juan de Borja y Enríquez de Luna (1495–1543), 3rd Duke of Gandía

See also
Juan Borja (motorcycle racer) (born 1970), Spanish Grand Prix rider
Juan Joya Borja (1956–2021), Spanish comedian and actor known by the stage name El Risitas
Giovanni Borgia (disambiguation)